Lucas Jay Dawson (born 12 November 1993) is an English footballer who plays as a midfielder.

Career
Dawson was born in Stoke-on-Trent and began his career at Stoke City where he progressed through the youth ranks at the club, eventually becoming captain of the under-18s. He was given first-team experience by manager Tony Pulis after being named on the bench against Beşiktaş and Valencia in the UEFA Europa League during the 2011–12 season. He advanced to the under-21s for the 2012–13 and 2013–14 campaigns and joined League One side Carlisle United on loan in March 2014. He made his professional debut on 21 April 2014 against Peterborough United. Dawson was released by Stoke in May 2014.

Dawson joined Conference Premier side Nuneaton Town on 18 March 2015. He signed with Chester in March 2017.

Career statistics

A.  The "Other" column constitutes appearances and goals in the Football League Trophy.

References

External links

1993 births
Living people
English footballers
Association football midfielders
Stoke City F.C. players
Carlisle United F.C. players
Nuneaton Borough F.C. players
English Football League players
AFC Telford United players
Chester F.C. players